Sutton House may refer to:

in England
Sutton House, London, a Grade II* listed Tudor manor house on Homerton High Street in the London Borough of Hackney

in Ireland
Sutton Castle, Dublin, a listed Tudor-revival mansion previously owned by Andrew Jameson

in the United States (by state)
Sutton House (St. Georges, Delaware)
Thomas Sutton House, Woodland Beach, Delaware
Warren Sutton House, Edison, Georgia
John Sutton House, Paris, Idaho
Warner P. Sutton House, Saugatuck, Michigan
Nathan Esek and Sarah Emergene Sutton House, Washtenaw County, Michigan
Sutton-Chapman-Howland House, Newark Valley, New York
Sutton House Apartments, New York, New York
Sutton-Newby House, Hertford, North Carolina
Sutton House (Decatur, Ohio), listed on the National Register of Historic Places (NRHP)
Sutton-Ditz House, Clarion, Pennsylvania
John Sutton Hall, Indiana, Pennsylvania
Ephraim D. and William D. Sutton House, Park City, Utah, listed on the NRHP
Harvey P. Sutton House, McCook, Nebraska

See also
Sutton Block
Sutton Farm
Sutton Barn